World Action and Adventure is a role-playing game published by M.S. Kinney Corporation in 1985.

Description
World Action and Adventure is a universal system, with character creation, skill, combat, and mass combat rules. The boxed set includes the Official Guide, a GM's screen, character record sheets, and blank forms.

Publication history
World Action and Adventure was designed by Gregory L. Kinney, and published by M.S. Kinney Corporation in 1985 as a boxed set containing a 160-page hardcover book, a cardstock screen, a packet of blank forms, a small pad of character sheets, and dice.

Reception
Lawrence Schick comments: "WA&A is beyond doubt the nicest RPG ever published. The three books attempt to describe everything on Earth from a staggeringly naive worldview. The rulebooks consist of a multitude of very general tables that list everything the author could think of. The descriptions that accompany the tables are so ingenuous, they're just priceless. Then there's the poem, "World Action and Adventure": 20 verses, each describing a different aspect of adventure. An excerpt: 'Pyramids are being built/the Pharaoh has a suppressed guilt/so many slaves they thirst and die/to build these things that touch the sky" ... it just goes on and on."

References

Role-playing games introduced in 1983
Universal role-playing games